Marino Baždarić (born 25 November 1978) is a Croatian former professional basketball player, who is currently the sports director for Cedevita Junior.

Career statistics

External links 
 ACB Profile 

1978 births
Living people
ABA League players
Croatian expatriate basketball people in Spain
Croatian men's basketball players
KK Cedevita players
KK Cibona players
KK Olimpija players
Liga ACB players
Menorca Bàsquet players
Small forwards
Basketball players from Rijeka
KK Kvarner players